Vasily Vasilyevich Mate (– ), or Mathé, was a Russian artist and engraver. While he was not the author of any major original works, he was one of the major engravers in Russia during the late 19th century. He collaborated with major Russian painters and produced engravings of their paintings, thus helping popularize Russian art.

Selected paintings

External links
 

1856 births
1917 deaths
19th-century engravers
20th-century engravers
Russian engravers
Imperial Academy of Arts alumni
Full Members of the Imperial Academy of Arts